Mystriosuchini, historically known as Pseudopalatinae, is an extinct tribe (formerly subfamily) of derived phytosaurs in the clade Leptosuchomorpha. As with all other phytosaurs, mystriosuchins lived during Late Triassic. The name is derived from the genus Mystriosuchus.

Genera classified in Mystriosuchini include Coburgosuchus, Machaeroprosopus, Mystriosuchus, Nicrosaurus and Redondasaurus. It includes the most ecologically divergent phytosaurs, the terrestrial Nicrosaurus and the fully aquatic Mystriosuchus.

Phylogeny
Below is a cladogram from Stocker (2012):

References

Phytosaurs
Late Triassic first appearances
Late Triassic extinctions